The Bombardier 3.8 is a Canadian sailing dinghy, first built in 1974.

The design is a development of the 1973 Bombardier Invitation, although smaller and lighter.

The boat was sold in Sweden as the Triss Racer.

Production
The design was built by Bombardier Limited in Canada, but it is now out of production.

Design
The Bombardier 3.8 is a recreational sailboat, built predominantly of fibreglass. It has an unstayed catboat rig, a raked stem, vertical transom, a wooden transom-hung rudder controlled by a tiller and a wooden daggerboard keel. It displaces .

See also
List of sailing boat types

Related development
Bombardier Invitation

Similar sailboats
Laser (dinghy)

References

Dinghies
1970s sailboat type designs
Sailing yachts
Sailboat types built by Bombardier Limited